32nd Armoured Reconnaissance  Group (pl: 32 Dywizjon Pancerny) - Polish reconnaissance unit in the Polish September Campaign.

The 32nd Armoured Reconnaissance Group was mobilised in August 1939 by the 7th Armoured Battalion stationed in Grodno, for the Podlaska Cavalry Brigade.  Mjr  Stanislaw Szostak  was given the command of the group. The group consisted of one tankette squadron with 13 TKS tankettes armed with heavy machine guns, 1 armoured car squadron with 8 type 34-II armoured cars armed with a 37 mm cannon and  2 machine guns  and one transport squadron with a repair vehicle, tankers  and lorries.  On 2 September the tankette squadron supported the 9th Mounted Rifle Regiment to capture  Gross Brzosken in East Prussia defended by German border guards and units of the Landwehr.  As there were no major German units in the area Polish forces withdrew back into Poland.  On 3/4 September Germans broke through the Polish defence lines West of the Podlaska Cavalry Brigade. The brigade was ordered to slow down the German advance. From that day the armoured squadrons of the group gave mobile machine gun and cannon support  to the units of the brigade, fighting Panzer Division Kempf  and Wehrmacht.  The group suffered losses both in armour and men.  On 13 September, covering the fighting retreat of the brigade, the group found itself behind German lines near Wyliny-Rus, which was burnt by the Germans as a reprisal for a successful attack by the group. In the village there are graves of two Polish soldiers killed in 1939. The group managed to break through the German lines suffering further losses and, on 14 September, rejoined the brigade, in the Pietkowo forest near Lapy .  Gen. Kmicic –Skrzynski,C O of the brigade, decided to withdraw  to Bialowieza forest  and allowed the group to cross the Narew and proceed to Wolkowysk (Vavkavysk). The river was crossed on 15 September over a railway bridge near Strabla.  It reached the town on 16 September having lost the remnants of its armour.  On 17 September the Soviets attacked Poland and Mjr Szostak was ordered to drive to Wilno to join  the defence of the town. As Wilno was captured by the Soviets, a new order was issued, on 19 September,  for the Polish troops to cross the Lithuanian border. Mjr Szostak refused to cross the border and decided to drive to Grodno to fight the Soviets with his men having been joined by a platoon of anti-aircraft artillery(Bofors, 40 mm gun) of the 94th Anti-aircraft Battery  commanded by 2nd Lt. Musial.  In the morning of 20 September they reached Grodno which was under attack by Soviet forces. 

In the morning of 21 September, from the barracks of the 7th Armoured Battalion, they machine gunned advancing Soviet infantry who found themselves in the cross fire and retreated suffering heavy losses. Later in the day, on the orders of Gen. Przezdziecki, the group started to withdraw towards the Lithuanian Border.  On 22 September Mjr Szostak organised the defence of Giby but having not received requested anti-tank weapons and explosives decided to continue the withdrawal to Lithuania. On 24 September,  Mjr Szostak and his men crossed the border near Szypliszki. About an hour later, Soviet tanks arrived at the Lithuanian border.

Subsequently, the officers and soldiers of the 32nd Armoured Reconnaissance Group served in the 2nd Polish Corps of the 8th British Army. Lt. Strokowski was killed by a Lithuanian internment camp guard.

Command Structure

Commander: Mjr Stanislaw Szostak
Adjutant:  Lt Wlodzimierz Zeltzer
Tankette Squadron:
C.O. Lt Janusz Zongollowich
C.O. 1st Platoon: Lt Jerzy Rudolph
(C.O. 2nd Platoon: Officer Cadet (sergeant) Wereszczaka
Armoured Car Squadron
C.O.: Lt Alexander Strokowski
C.O. 1st Platoon: 2nd Lt Tadeusz Stopczyk
C.O. 2nd Platoon: Officer Cadet (sergeant) Zoledziewski
Transport Repair Squadron
 C.O.: 2nd Lt Wladyslaw Kitowski

Bibliography
 Marian Żebrowski: Zarys historii polskiej broni pancernej 1918 - 1947. Zarząd Zrzeszenia Kół Oddziałowych Broni Pancernych. Londyn 1971
 Szubański Rajmund  Polska broń pancerna 1939  Wydaw. Min. Obrony Narodowej Warszawa 1989
 A. Suchcitz, M. Wroński: Barwa Pułku 7 Pancernego - zarys monograficzny. Wydawnictwo Instytutu Tarnogórskiego. Tarnowskie Góry 2002
 "Taran" - Jednodniówka Podchorązych Broni Pancernej. Irak 1943
 Karol Liszewski: "Wojna Polsko-Sowiecka 1939". Polska Fundacja Kulturalna. Londyn 1986

Military units and formations of Poland in World War II
Military units and formations established in 1939
Military units and formations disestablished in 1939